Released in February 1999, Xray Sierra is the critically acclaimed fourth solo studio album by Red Rider frontman Tom Cochrane. It featured the hits "I Wonder", "Willie Dixon Said", "Heartbreak Girl" and "Stonecutters Arms". Cochrane received a Best Male Vocalist Juno nomination for Xray Sierra. The album was recorded at Metalworks Studios in Toronto and Hipposonic Studios in Vancouver and was produced by Cochrane and John Webster.

Track listing

References

1999 albums
Tom Cochrane albums
Albums recorded at Hipposonic Studios
Albums recorded at Metalworks Studios